The Women's time trial at the 1997 UCI Road World Championships took place in San Sebastián, Spain on 8 October 1997.

Final classification

Source

References

Women's Time Trial
UCI Road World Championships – Women's time trial
UCI